Platyptilia montana is a moth of the family Pterophoridae. It is known from Honshu island, Japan.

The length of the forewings is 10–11 mm.

External links
Taxonomic and Biological Studies of Pterophoridae of Japan (Lepidoptera)
Japanese Moths

montana
Endemic fauna of Japan
Moths of Japan
Moths described in 1963